The First National Bank of Gilbert is a historic bank building in Gilbert, Minnesota, United States.  It was constructed in 1920.  It was listed on the National Register of Historic Places in 2012 for its local significance in the themes of architecture and commerce.  It was nominated for its prominent Neoclassical architecture and for the financial support it gave to the area's agricultural sector.  Located in a region better known for its mining industry, the First National Bank of Gilbert distinguished itself by providing capital to farmers and sponsoring agricultural societies.

See also
 National Register of Historic Places listings in St. Louis County, Minnesota

References

External links
 First National Bank of Gilbert

1920 establishments in Minnesota
Bank buildings on the National Register of Historic Places in Minnesota
Banks based in Minnesota
Commercial buildings completed in 1920
National Register of Historic Places in St. Louis County, Minnesota
Neoclassical architecture in Minnesota